Max Alvarez (born June 16, 1991) is an American soccer player.

Career

Youth and amateur
Alvarez played four years of college soccer at Sacramento State University. The forward was voted second team freshman All-America by Soccer America in 2009 by leading MPSF in scoring and points (23 points). In 2012, Alvarez played for FC Tucson in the USL PDL and led them to a play-off appearance.

Professional
Alvarez signed his first professional contract in March 2014, joining USL Pro club Sacramento Republic. Then in April 2017 he signed with Saint Louis FC and scored his first goal with the club in his first game with them.

Honors
Sacramento Republic
USL Cup: 2014

References

1991 births
Living people
People from Napa, California
Sacramento State Hornets men's soccer players
FC Tucson players
Sacramento Republic FC players
Association football forwards
Soccer players from California
USL League Two players
USL Championship players
American soccer players
Sacramento Gold FC players